= Kelaitha =

Kelaitha (Ancient Greek: Κελαίθα) was a town in ancient Thessaly. It is unlocated.
